Silver Point Capital is a Greenwich, Connecticut-based hedge fund that focuses on credit and special situations investments.

It was founded in 2002 by former Goldman Sachs partners, Edward A. Mulé and Robert J. O’Shea. Mulé headed or co-headed Goldman's Special Situations Investing Business from 1999 to 2001. O'Shea founded and headed Goldman's Global Bank Loan Business, and headed Goldman's Global High Yield Business. Together, they created and led Goldman's distressed debt and special situation lending businesses before leaving to create Silver Point.

In 2014, Silver Point ranked No. 1 overall in Institutional Investor's annual Hedge Fund Report Card survey. The fund received the highest scores out of all hedge funds across Alpha Generation, Alignment of Interests, and Transparency. In 2021, the company reported to manage  approximately  $15 billion in assets.

Investment strategy

Debt investments
Krispy Kreme

Notable investments
Duff & Phelps
Jet2 plc
Toys R Us
Men's Wearhouse
MoneyGram
Herbst Gaming
Dana Holding Corporation
Hostess Brands
Torch Energy Royalty Trust
Cooper-Standard Automotive
FiberMark
Sage Telecom
Communications Corporation of America
Granite Broadcasting Corporation
Postmedia Network Inc.
The Co-operative Bank, UK
Basic Energy Services
Debenhams
Metropolitan Gaming
Weatherford International

Corporate affairs

Prominent former employees
Harry Wilson, former politician

Recognition
In 2014, Silver Point ranked No. 1 overall in Institutional Investor's annual Hedge Fund Report Card survey. The fund received the highest scores in Alpha Generation, Alignment of Interests, and Transparency. In 2015, Silver Point ranked No. 2 overall in Institutional Investor's annual Hedge Fund Report Card survey.

References

External links
 Website for Silver Point Capital

Financial services companies established in 2002
Hedge fund firms in Connecticut
Financial services companies of Bermuda
Companies based in Greenwich, Connecticut
2002 establishments in Connecticut